John Lewis Selfridge (February 17, 1927 – October 31, 2010), was an American mathematician who contributed to the fields of analytic number theory, computational number theory, and combinatorics.

Education
Selfridge received his Ph.D. in 1958 from the University of California, Los Angeles under the supervision of Theodore Motzkin.

Career
Selfridge served on the faculties of the University of Illinois at Urbana-Champaign and Northern Illinois University from 1971 to 1991 (retirement), chairing the Department of Mathematical Sciences 1972–1976 and 1986–1990.
He was executive editor of Mathematical Reviews from 1978 to 1986, overseeing the computerization of its operations. He was a founder of the Number Theory Foundation, which has named its Selfridge prize in his honour.

Research
In 1962, he proved that 78,557 is a Sierpinski number; he showed that, when k = 78,557, all numbers of the form k2n + 1 have a factor in the covering set {3, 5, 7, 13, 19, 37, 73}. Five years later, he and Sierpiński proposed the conjecture that 78,557 is the smallest Sierpinski number, and thus the answer to the Sierpinski problem. A distributed computing project called Seventeen or Bust is currently trying to prove this statement,  only five of the original seventeen possibilities remain.

In 1964, Selfridge and Alexander Hurwitz proved that the 14th Fermat number  was composite.

However, their proof did not provide a factor. It was not until 2010 that the first factor of the 14th Fermat number was found.

In 1975 John Brillhart, Derrick Henry Lehmer, and Selfridge developed a method of proving the primality of p given only partial factorizations of p − 1 and p + 1.

Together with Samuel Wagstaff they also all participated in the Cunningham project.

Together with Paul Erdős, Selfridge solved a 150-year-old problem, proving that the product of consecutive numbers is never a power. It took them many years to find the proof, and John made extensive use of computers, but the final version of the proof requires only a modest amount of computation, namely evaluating an easily computed function f(n) for 30,000 consecutive values of n. Selfridge suffered from writer's block and thanked "R. B. Eggleton for reorganizing and writing the paper in its final form".

Selfridge also developed the Selfridge–Conway discrete procedure for creating an envy-free cake-cutting among three people. Selfridge developed this in 1960,  and John Conway independently discovered it in 1993. Neither of them ever published the result, but Richard Guy told many people Selfridge's solution in the 1960s, and it was eventually attributed to the two of them in a number of books and articles.

Selfridge's conjecture about Fermat numbers
Selfridge made the following conjecture about the Fermat numbers Fn = 22n + 1 . Let g(n) be the number of distinct prime factors of Fn . As to 2016, g(n) is known only up to n = 11, and it is monotonic. Selfridge conjectured that contrary to appearances, g(n) is NOT monotonic. In support of his conjecture he showed: a sufficient (but not necessary) condition for its truth is the existence of another Fermat prime beyond the five known (3, 5, 17, 257, 65537).

Selfridge's conjecture about primality testing
This conjecture is also called the PSW conjecture, after Selfridge, Carl Pomerance, and Samuel Wagstaff.

Let p be an odd number, with p ≡ ± 2 (mod 5). Selfridge conjectured that if

 2p−1 ≡ 1 (mod p) and at the same time
 fp+1 ≡ 0 (mod p),
where fk is the kth Fibonacci number, then p is a prime number, and he offered $500 for an example disproving this. He also offered $20 for a proof that the conjecture was true. The Number Theory Foundation will now cover this prize. An example will actually yield you $620 because Samuel Wagstaff offers $100 for an example or a proof, and Carl Pomerance offers $20 for an example and $500 for a proof. Selfridge requires that a factorization be supplied, but Pomerance does not. The conjecture was still open August 23, 2015. The related test that fp−1 ≡ 0 (mod p) for p ≡ ±1 (mod 5) is false and has e.g. a 6-digit counterexample. The smallest counterexample for +1 (mod 5) is 6601 = 7 × 23 × 41 and the smallest for −1 (mod 5) is 30889 = 17 × 23 × 79. It should be known that a heuristic by Pomerance may show this conjecture is false (and therefore, a counterexample should exist).

See also 
 Sierpinski number
 New Mersenne conjecture
 Lander, Parkin, and Selfridge conjecture
 Erdős–Selfridge function at Wolfram MathWorld

References

Publications

1927 births
2010 deaths
20th-century American mathematicians
Number theorists
University of California, Los Angeles alumni
People from Ketchikan, Alaska
People from DeKalb, Illinois